The 2010 Asian Men's Volleyball Cup, so-called 2010 AVC Cup for Men was the second edition of the Asian Cup, played by top eight teams of the 2009 Asian Championship. The tournament was held at Ghadir Arena, Urmia, Iran from 1 to 7 August 2010.

Pools composition
The teams are seeded based on their final ranking at the 2009 Asian Men's Volleyball Championship.

Venue
 Ghadir Arena, Urmia, Iran

Preliminary round

Pool A

|}

|}

Pool B

|}

|}

Final round

Quarterfinals

|}

5th–8th semifinals

|}

Semifinals

|}

7th place

|}

5th place

|}

3rd place

|}

Final

|}

Final standing

Awards
MVP:  Farhad Nazari Afshar
Best Scorer:  Sanjay Kumar
Best Spiker:  Cui Jianjun
Best Blocker:  Alireza Nadi
Best Server:  Wang Ming-chun
Best Setter:  Saeid Marouf
Best Libero:  Abdolreza Alizadeh

External links
Asian Volleyball Confederation

Asian Men's Volleyball Cup
AVC Cup
V
International volleyball competitions hosted by Iran